Cecil Facer Secondary School is a school located in the South End of Greater Sudbury, Ontario, beyond the residential/commercial sector. It is a school for students with difficulties with the law and also acts as a detention centre.

Information
Principal: John Capin
Trustee: Doreen Dewar
Enrollment as of October 31, 2005: 53 full-time equivalent

References

High schools in Greater Sudbury